The Minister of State for Prisons, Parole and Probation is a mid-level ministerial office in the Ministry of Justice. It has, at times, been seen as the deputy to the Secretary of State for Justice and Lord Chancellor.

Responsibilities 
The minister currently has responsibility of the following policy areas:

 Prison operations, policy, reform and industrial relations
 Probation policy and operations
 Youth justice
 Parole
 Offender health
 Offender Cohorts
 Extremism
 Home Detention Curfew (HDC)
 Release on Temporary Licence (ROTL) schemes
 Drugs
 Electronic monitoring
 Reducing reoffending

The minister also provides support on Global Britain and the promotion of legal services.

List of Ministers for Prisons

References

See also 

 Ministry of Justice (United Kingdom)
 His Majesty's Prison Service

Lists of government ministers of the United Kingdom
Prisons ministers
Ministerial offices in the United Kingdom
Prisons in the United Kingdom
Ministry of Justice (United Kingdom)
English law
Home Office (United Kingdom)
2010 establishments in England
2010 establishments in the United Kingdom
1995 establishments in the United Kingdom
British government officials